Alberto Tarchiani (11 November 1885 – 30 November 1964) was an Italian journalist, politician, and diplomat.

Biography
Born in Rome, Tarchiani  studied at La Sapienza, at the University of Genoa and at the University of Florence, and started working as a journalist in 1903. In 1907 he moved to New York, where he edited the weekly magazine Il Cittadino. In 1915 he returned to Italy to serve as a voluntary in the Italian Army in World War I. In 1919 he was employed by Corriere della Sera, remaining there until 1925, when because of his opposition to Fascism he was forced to emigrate in France.

In Paris, Tarchiani was among the founders of  Giustizia e Libertà and collaborated to the newspaper  La giovine Italia. Following the 1940 German invasion of France, he moved to New York where he was secretary of the Mazzini Society in which he was actively worked with his close ally Alberto Cianca. With the fall of Fascism, Tarchiani served as minister of public works in the Badoglio cabinet, as head the Office of National Reconstruction in the subsequent Bonomi cabinet, and as ambassador in the United States from 1945 to 1955.

Honors
 Order of Merit of the Italian Republic 1st Class / Knight Grand Cross – December 30, 1952

See also 
 Ministry of Foreign Affairs (Italy)
 Foreign relations of Italy

References

1885 births
1964 deaths
Politicians from Rome
Journalists from Rome
Italian male journalists
Italian magazine editors
Italian politicians
Ambassadors of Italy to the United States
Italian diplomats
20th-century diplomats
Sapienza University of Rome alumni
University of Genoa alumni
University of Florence alumni
20th-century Italian journalists
Diplomats from Rome
20th-century Italian male writers
Italian anti-fascists